The Mamiya Six, also known as the Mamiya-6, is a series of folding medium-format rangefinder cameras manufactured by Mamiya between 1940 and the late 1950s.  The cameras captured twelve 6 cm × 6 cm images on 120 film rolls.  Some later models could also take sixteen 4.5 cm × 6 cm images.  The cameras were coupled rangefinders, but had a unique focusing mechanism that moved the film plane instead of the lens.  The lenses were not interchangeable, and were made by various Japanese manufacturers.  Beginning with the model IV, the name on the top plate changed from "Mamiya Six" (two lines) to "Mamiya-6".

Models
 Mamiya Six I (1940)
 Mamiya Six I A (1941)
 Mamiya Six III (1942)
 Mamiya Six II (1943)
 Mamiya Six II A (1943)
 Mamiya-6 IV (1947)
 Mamiya-6 V (1953)
 Mamiya-6 K (1954)
 Mamiya-6 IV B (1955)
 Mamiya-6 Automat (1955)
 Mamiya-6 K II (1956)
 Mamiya-6 IV S (1957)
 Mamiya-6 P (1957)
 Mamiya-6 Automat 2 (1958)

See also
 List of Mamiya products

References
 Mamiya Camera Museum - 6×6 and 6×7 cameras

External links
 Mamiya Six page at Camera-wiki.org
 The Mamiya-6, a Classic 120 Folder a review of the Mamiya Six

Mamiya rangefinder cameras
120 film cameras